Im Chae-moo (born September 2, 1949) is a South Korean actor.

Filmography

Television series

Film

Variety show

Awards and nominations

References

External links
 
 
 

1949 births
Living people
South Korean male film actors
South Korean male television actors
Republic of Korea Marine Corps personnel